Prince Napoléon is a title of the House of Bonaparte, an imperial and royal European dynasty founded in 1804 .

Prince Napoléon may also refer to:
 Victor, Prince Napoléon (1862–1926), pretender to the Imperial Throne of France
 Louis, Prince Napoléon (1914–1997), pretender to the Imperial Throne of France
 Charles, Prince Napoléon (born 1950)
 Jean-Christophe, Prince Napoléon (born 1986)